Seh Barar (also Romanized as Seh Barār; also known as Seh Barādar) is a village in Lajran Rural District, in the Central District of Garmsar County, Semnan Province, Iran. At the 2006 census, its population was 131, in 39 families.

References 

Populated places in Garmsar County